The Gen. George Godfrey House is a historic colonial American house located at 125 County Street in Taunton, Massachusetts.

Description and history 
The Federal style house was built in 1780 for George Godfrey, who served as a brigadier general during the Revolutionary War.

At that time, the house was one of three documented houses of the Georgian and Federal periods in Taunton that exhibited true double-pile plans and early stylistic details. However, the house has since been covered with vinyl siding and much of it original wood trim has been lost. It is currently occupied by Nightingale Visiting Nurses.

It was added to the National Register of Historic Places on July 5, 1984.

See also
National Register of Historic Places listings in Taunton, Massachusetts

References

National Register of Historic Places in Taunton, Massachusetts
Houses in Taunton, Massachusetts
Houses on the National Register of Historic Places in Bristol County, Massachusetts
Houses completed in 1780